Duldzin Dragpa Gyaltsen (1374-1434), the first Kyorlung Ngari Tulku, was one of the principal disciples of Je Tsongkhapa, the founder of the Gelugpa school of Tibetan Buddhism.

Duldzin Dragpa Gyaltsen is renowned for his strict adherence to the  Vinaya or Buddhist monastic code  as well as for his survey of the Sarvadurgatipariśodhana  Tantra.

Dragpa Gyaltsen was the founder of Tsunmo Tsal (btsun mo tshal) monastery in Tagtse Dzong (stag rtse rdzong), Central Tibet.

His students included  Jamyang Choje Tashi Palden  (1379-1449), the founder of Drepung Monastery, and most of the other important Gelug masters of the time.

Subsequent re-births 
 Charchen Chödrak
 Panchen Sönam Drakpa [1478—1554]
 Sönam Yéshé Wangpo
 Ngakwang Sönam Gélek Pelzang
 Tulku Drakpa Gyeltsen
 Ngakwang Jinpa Jamyang Tenpé Gyeltsen
 Lozang Tashi
 Lozang Gélek Drakpa
 Lozang Jikmé Tenpé Gyeltsen 
 Ngakwang Tsültrim Tenpé Gyeltsen
 Khédrup Tendzin Chökyi Nyima
 Ngakwang Lozang Khédrup Tendzin Gyatso
 Tendzin Chögyel [b.1946]

Works
 dul ba'i bslab bya chen mo -on the Vinaya rules of monastic discipline.
 kun rig rnam bshad - a survey of the Sarvadurgatipariśodhana  Tantra

References

External links
Biography of Duldzin Dragpa Gyaltsen - at The Treasury of Lives
 Painting of Duldzin Dragpa Gyaltsen - at himalayanart.org

Gelug Lamas
1374 births
1434 deaths
14th-century Tibetan people
15th-century Tibetan people
14th-century lamas
15th-century lamas